Events in the year 1996 in Cyprus.

Incumbents 

 President: Demetris Christofias
 President of the Parliament: Yiannakis Omirou

Events 
Ongoing – Cyprus dispute

 26 May – Democratic Rally won 20 of the 56 seats in the parliament following parliamentary elections. Voter turnout was 92.9%.

Deaths

References 

 
1990s in Cyprus
Years of the 21st century in Cyprus
Cyprus
Cyprus
Cyprus